Kesari bat or kesari baat is a sweet Indian food that is common throughout the country. The classic ingredients used for its preparation are semolina, sugar, ghee (usually), water, and milk. The sweet is more commonly known as Jonnadula Halwa in certain parts of northern India.

The precise composition of kesari bath varies regionally depending on the availability of ingredients. The dish might be prepared with pineapple, banana, mango, coconut, or rice.

Claims to the origin of the dish are made by Karnataka, Tamil Nadu, and other regions of South India. The dish is common in the cuisine of Karnataka as well as of multiple regions in South India and is a popular dish during festivals such as Ugadi. The word kesari in multiple Indian languages refers to the spice saffron which creates the dish's saffron-orange-yellow-colored tinge. Though it is a sweet dish, in Andhra Pradesh, Karnataka, Kerala and Tamil Nadu, it is prepared not only as a dessert but also for normal breakfasts. It is also served with uppittu or khara bath, and a serving of both dishes on one plate is popularly called "chow chow bath". 

In North India, it is served as a sweet dish called sheera or suji halwa. It is much simpler with little or no ghee, no color or saffron in contrast to the actual traditional recipe of Karnataka. It is commonly known as sheera in Marathi/Hindi, rava kesari in 
Malayalam, Telugu and Tamil, and suji halwa in North India and Bangladesh.

History 
The dish is listed as shali-anna in Manasollasa, a 12th-century work by the Chalukya king Someshvara III.

References

External links 

Indian desserts